Lord Jim may refer to:

 Lord Jim, a 1900 novel written by Joseph Conrad
 Lord Jim (1925 film), a film based on the novel 
Lord Jim (1965 film), a film based on the novel 
Lord Jim Wallace of Tankerness, Scottish politician
"Lucky Lord Jim", a song from the 1986 album Laughing at the Pieces

See also
Jim Lord, Minnesotan lawyer
Jim Lord (singer-songwriter)
Lord Tim